Tom J. Anderson (born Ahmad Rezaee Mirghaed,  1975/1976 – 12 November 2011) was a businessman and the eldest son of Iranian Major General Mohsen Rezaee. 

He defected to the Embassy of the United States, Vienna in 1998, which led to the Central Intelligence Agency (CIA) bringing him to New York City and granting him political asylum. He then had several interviews with Voice of America, BBC and Radio Israel, voicing his opposition with the Iranian government and activities of Islamic Revolutionary Guard Corps abroad. 

He returned to Iran in 2005, without being prosecuted.

Personal life 
He married the daughter of his father's close friend when he was 19 and studied mathematics at a teacher training college in Tehran, but the couple soon separated. He reportedly married an American citizen later. According to Kenneth R. Timmerman, he had a daughter who was 7 years old and lived in California as of 2011.

Death 
On 12 November 2011, his body was found on the floor of room 23 on the 18th floor of Gloria Hotel, located in Dubai Media City. Officials at Dubai Police Force declared that he was identified as a U.S. citizen named Tom Anderson, and the cause of death was "an overdose of a medicine used to fight depression and schizophrenia". His death had been described as "suspicious" and alternative reasons such as suicide, murder and assassination were suggested as the cause of death.

See also
List of Iranian defectors
List of unsolved deaths

References 

2011 deaths
American businesspeople
CIA activities in Iran
Defectors to the United States
Iranian businesspeople
Iranian defectors
Iranian emigrants to the United States
Iranian refugees
People with acquired American citizenship
Unsolved deaths
Year of birth missing
Drug-related deaths